Denise Kay Hampson (born 1978) is a Welsh female former track cyclist.

Cycling career
Hampson became a British track champion after winning the British National Individual Sprint Championships in 2001.

She competed for Team GB between 1999 and 2004, before retiring.

References

1978 births
British female cyclists
British track cyclists
Living people
People from Clwyd